Stride is a mobile app for customer relationship management, released in 2012.

References

External links

Customer_relationship_management_software